South United Football Club  is an Indian professional football club based in Bengaluru, Karnataka, that competes in the Bangalore Super Division. They have also competed in the I-League 2nd Division, then second tier of Indian football league system.

History
South United Football Club was founded on 16 August 2012 in Bangalore with the long-term goal of providing a base for youngsters, not only in the city but entire southern region, to take up football as a professional career.

In 2013, South United roped in Raman Vijayan as new head coach and Noel Wilson as their team mentor. They began their league journey on 6 December 2012 in the 2012–13 Bangalore Super Division, at the Bangalore Football Stadium against Army Service Corps where the club won 2–0 with former I-League player, Gunashekar Vignesh, scoring the first ever goal for the club in the 47th minute, ending campaign as runners-up.

South United competed for the first time in 2013 I-League 2nd Division. They started their journey in the country's second division by 3–4 loss to Luangmual FC on March 11, 2013. This followed by two 1–0 defeats against Vasco S.C. and Southern Samity. South United won their first match in the second division by beating Hindustan F.C. 2–0 on March 20, 2013. The club failed to go further in the league finishing fifth with two wins, a draw and four losses in qualifying Group C.

South United pulled out of second division next season after AIFF's decided to end financial support to second division clubs. 
 
The club won their premier victory at Kolhapur with the prestigious Kedari Redekar United Cup by beating Pune FC.

South United were the runners up of the 2014–15 Bangalore Super Division.

In April, 2015, the club was taken over by Sharan Parikh, a Mumbai-based businessman. They returned to second division in 2018–19 season. In August 2019, Manchester City legend Terry Phelan was appointed as technical director.

Home ground

South United plays its home matches at the Bangalore Football Stadium, an Astroturf stadium located in the Garden city.

Kit manufacturers and shirt sponsors

Players

First-team squad

 (on loan from Kerala Blasters FC (B) )

 

 (on loan from Kerala Blasters FC (B))
 
 

 (on loan from ATK)

Records

Key
DNQ = did not qualify
DNP = Did not play
TBD = To be decided
TBA = To be added
PR = Priliminary Round

Season

Managerial history
updated on 28 July 2021

Honours

League
 Bangalore Super Division
Runners-up (4): 2012–13, 2013–14, 2014–15, 2015–16

Others
Kedari Redekar Football Tournament
Champions (1): 2012

References

External links
 South United FC profile at Soccerway.
 Official team page at Facebook.

 
Association football clubs established in 2012
Football clubs in Bangalore
2012 establishments in Karnataka
I-League 2nd Division clubs